Frostee Lynn Rucker (born September 14, 1983) is a former American football defensive lineman. He played college football at USC, and was drafted by the Cincinnati Bengals in the third round of the 2006 NFL Draft. Rucker has also played for the Cleveland Browns, Arizona Cardinals, and Oakland Raiders.

Early years
Rucker went to Tustin High School in Tustin, California, which DeShaun Foster, Matt McCoy, Chris Chester and Sam Baker also attended. He played running back and linebacker at Tustin High School and was named All-Golden West League MVP as a Senior in 2000. He attended Santa Ana High School during his junior year and earned All-League honors as a linebacker. He played both his freshman and senior years at Tustin High.

College career
Rucker attended Colorado State before transferring and playing at USC from 2002 to 2005.

Professional career

Pre-draft

Cincinnati Bengals
Rucker was selected by the Cincinnati Bengals in the third round (91st overall) of the 2006 NFL Draft. He was placed on the injured reserve list his rookie year in 2006.

In 2007, Rucker contributed on special teams and situational opportunities on defense. He started the final regular season game against the Miami Dolphins and finished with five tackles.

In 2008, Rucker started 4 games and played in 11 (both career highs). He finished with 24 total tackles, two forced fumbles, and a pass defensed.

In 2009, the Cincinnati Bengals won the AFC North and Rucker finished with 13 tackles, and an interception returned 26 yards.

In the 2010 season, Rucker had 17 tackles, a sack, and a pass defensed.

In 2011, Rucker had 44 tackles and four sacks. He also led all defensive ends in stops per snap percentage.

Cleveland Browns

Rucker signed with the Cleveland Browns on March 14, 2012. He was released during the 2013 offseason on February 5, 2013.

Arizona Cardinals
Rucker signed with the Arizona Cardinals on March 21, 2013.

On March 17, 2017, Rucker re-signed with the Cardinals.

On November 5, 2017, in Week 9 against the 49ers, Rucker was ejected after being involved in a fight with Carlos Hyde. On November 10, 2017, Rucker was fined $9,115 for his role in the fight.

Oakland Raiders
On June 12, 2018, Rucker signed with the Oakland Raiders.

Personal life
Rucker was among a group of investors that placed a marijuana legalization initiative on the Ohio ballot in 2015. The initiative would have granted exclusive grow rights to Rucker and the other investors in the plan, but ultimately it was defeated.

References

External links
 Cleveland Browns bio

1983 births
Living people
People from Tustin, California
Players of American football from California
American football defensive ends
USC Trojans football players
Cincinnati Bengals players
Cleveland Browns players
Arizona Cardinals players
Oakland Raiders players
Sportspeople from Orange County, California